This article lists the military commanders of divided Vienna between 1945 and 1955. Following the end of World War II in Europe, the Allies divided Vienna into distinct, occupied sectors, each had its own military governor, often referred to as commandant. This practice ended officially with the Austrian State Treaty, which re-established Austrian independence in 1955, when the respective occupying/protective forces were withdrawn.

Commandants

American sector

British sector

French sector

Soviet sector

See also
Cold War
Allied-occupied Austria

References

Commandants Of Vienna Sectors
Commandants Of Vienna Sectors
Vienna Sectors, Commandants
Commandants Of Vienna Sectors
Berlin Sectors, Commandants
Commandants Of Vienna Sectors
Commandants Of Vienna Sectors